Abon'go Malik "Roy" Obama (born March 1958) is a Kenyan-American businessman and politician known for being the older half-brother of 44th president of the United States, Barack Obama, and the eldest son of economist Barack Obama Sr.

Biography 
Abon'go Malik "Roy" Obama was born and raised in Nairobi, Kenya. His parents are economist Barack Obama Sr. and his first wife, Kezia Obama (née Aoko). Obama earned a degree in accounting from the University of Nairobi. He met his younger half-brother, Barack Obama, for the first time in 1985, when Barack flew from Chicago to Washington, D.C., to visit Malik. The two each served as best man at the other's wedding. Barack brought his wife Michelle Obama to Kenya three years later, seeing Malik again while meeting many other relatives for the first time. Malik Obama is Muslim. He is a naturalized citizen of the United States who was registered to vote in Maryland as of 2016.

Malik Obama lives in the Obamas' ancestral home, Nyang'oma Kogelo, a village of several hundred people, preferring its slow pace to that of the city. Until 2004, he ran a small electronics shop a half-hour's drive away in another town.  Since 2008, Obama has run the Barack H. Obama Foundation.  Although much of the Obama family has dispersed throughout Kenya and overseas, most, including Malik, still consider their rural village on the shores of Lake Victoria to be their true home. They feel that those who have left the village have become culturally "lost". A frequent visitor to the United States, and a consultant in Washington, D.C., for several months each year, Obama has dual citizenship in Kenya and the United States.

Political career and advocacy 
During his brother's 2008 presidential campaign, Malik Obama was a spokesman for the extended Obama family in Kenya. He dealt with safety and privacy concerns arising from the increased attention from the press.

Obama ran for governor of the Kenyan county of Siaya in 2013. His campaign slogan was "Obama here, Obama there" in reference to his half-brother who was serving his second term as the President of the United States. Malik garnered 2,792 votes, about 140,000 votes behind the eventual winner.

Prior to the 2016 United States presidential election, Obama stated that he supported Donald Trump, the candidate for the Republican Party. He attended the third presidential debate as one of Trump's guests.

On June 12, 2020, Malik reportedly endorsed United States president Donald Trump, and later in the week posted a fake and historically inaccurate birth certificate of Obama in support of the Barack Obama citizenship conspiracy theories. The birth certificate alleges Obama was born in the Republic of Kenya in 1961, despite the Republic of Kenya not being founded until December 12, 1964. The faux Kenyan certificate also contained a seal which read South Australia, further affirming its lack of authenticity. His sister Auma (among others) condemned him for promoting the theory.

References

External links

 

Obama family
People from Nairobi
1958 births
Living people
Kenyan politicians
Kenyan businesspeople
21st-century businesspeople
21st-century American politicians
People from Siaya County
Naturalized citizens of the United States
American people of Kenyan descent
African-American Muslims
Kenyan Muslims
21st-century Kenyan politicians
University of Nairobi alumni